New Horizon is a studio album by the progressive bluegrass band Country Gentlemen, released in 1992.

Track listing 
 The Foggy Dew	(Randall Hylton) 2:19
 Fickle Wind (Randall Hylton) 2:16
 Even Now 3:36
 Somewhere in Kansas (Gaskin) 3:02
 Trouble Is Your Child (Gaskin) 3:25
 Waltz of the Angels (Dick Reynolds, Jack Rhodes) 3:46
 Frankie and Johnnie (Traditional) 2:07
 Cumberland River (Randall Hylton) 2:24
 Gonna Be Raining When I Die (Pete Goble, Bobby Osborne) 3:09
 Room At The Top Of The Stairs (Randall Hylton) 3:46
 Limehouse Blues (Douglas Furber, Philip Braham) 2:53
 New Freedom Bell (Osborne) 3:02
 Parent's Prayer (Evens, May) 2:14

Personnel 
 Charlie Waller – guitar, vocals
 Randall Hylton – mandolin, vocals
 Billy Rose – banjo, guitar, bass guitar, vocals
 Jimmy Bowen – bass guitar, mandolin, vocals
 Glen Duncan – violin
 Gene Wooten – guitar, bass guitar, Dobro

References

External links 
 https://web.archive.org/web/20091215090142/http://www.lpdiscography.com/c/Cgentlemen/cgent.htm

1992 albums
Rebel Records albums
The Country Gentlemen albums